Aplus scaber is a species of sea snail, a marine gastropod mollusk in the family Pisaniidae.

Description

Distribution

References

 Nordsieck, F. (1972). Marine Gastropoden aus der Shiqmona-Bucht in Israël. Archiv für Molluskenkunde der Senckenbergischen Naturforschenden Gesellschaft. 102(4-6): 227–245.
 Gofas, S.; Le Renard, J.; Bouchet, P. (2001). Mollusca. in: Costello, M.J. et al. (eds), European Register of Marine Species: a check-list of the marine species in Europe and a bibliography of guides to their identification. Patrimoines Naturels. 50: 180-213

External links
 Locard A. (1891). Les coquilles marines des côtes de France. Annales de la Société Linnéenne de Lyon. 37: 1-385
 Risso A. (1826-1827). Histoire naturelle des principales productions de l'Europe Méridionale et particulièrement de celles des environs de Nice et des Alpes Maritimes. Paris, Levrault
  Aissaoui C., Puillandre N., Bouchet P., Fassio G., Modica M.V. & Oliverio M. (2016). Cryptic diversity in Mediterranean gastropods of the genus Aplus (Neogastropoda: Buccinidae). Scientia Marina. 80(4): 521-533

Pisaniidae
Gastropods described in 1891